Harold Simpson may refer to:
Bullet Joe Simpson (Harold Edward Joseph Simpson, 1893–1973), Canadian ice hockey defenceman
Hack Simpson (Harold Alfred Simpson, 1910–1978), Canadian ice hockey player
Harold Simpson (cricketer) (1879–1924), English cricketer
Harold Simpson, songwriter, see List of compositions by Eric Coates
Harold Simpson, writer of Spy of Napoleon

See also
Harry Simpson (disambiguation)
Harold Fraser-Simson (1872–1944), English composer of light music